Optical scanning can refer to:
 an optical reader
 a 3D scanner